This is a list of films produced by Twentieth Century Pictures,  distributed by United Artists and 20th Century-Fox Film Corporation

Merge of 1935
20th Century Pictures merged with the bankrupt Fox Film Corporation on May 31, 1935 to form the blockbuster 20th Century-Fox Film Corporation which already had its first film right after the merger which was Under the Pampas Moon.
The company eventually started producing 20th Century-Fox films until 1936 while Fox Film gave up after a few months due to the debt William Fox had been facing since the Wall Street Crash of 1929

References

External links

Lists of films by studio
American films by studio

Disney-related lists